Look at What the Light Did Now is a documentary/live album DVD/CD by Canadian indie pop artist Feist, first released in December 2010. The DVD comprises an 80-minute documentary directed by Anthony Seck, five music videos from 2007 album The Reminder, and a number of live performances recorded between 2007 and 2009, including covers of songs by artists such as Little River Band and Ron Sexsmith.

The set's accompanying CD features live tracks and solo piano takes of tracks from The Reminder, along with live covers of songs by artists such as The Kinks and Peggy Lee, and two studio recordings of a new song, Look at What the Light Did Now, written by Little Wings.

Prior to its December 2010 home video release, the documentary screened at number of international fall festivals, including the 2010 Raindance Film Festival in London, CPH:DOX in Copenhagen, and the Pop Montreal music festival in Quebec. Look at What the Light Did Now marks both Feist's first official documentary and first official live album.

Reception
Look at What the Light Did Now received limited reviews upon release that were mostly positive. Music site Drowned in Sound gave the release 8/10, stating that it is "absolutely worth your time and attention," while at AllMusic, reviewer Andrew Leahey gave the release 3.5/5, commenting: "Feist sounds great throughout, with a quirky alto voice that, although imperfect, only seems to break at the right moments."

Meanwhile, film site Indiewire gave the film a B+ rating, stating that it was not a typical rock documentary. Reviewer Kimber Myers said it "sets itself apart with an aesthetic that veers between art film and hipster craft fair, a tone that perfectly matches Feist’s own music, itself a mixture of polished and smartly produced tracks and earthy, quirky additions".

Accolades
Look at What the Light Did Now won the 'DVD of the Year' prize at the 2012 Juno Awards in Canada, and was nominated for the Sound & Vision Award at CPH:DOX in Denmark.

Tour dates

Track listing

Disc one (DVD)
Feature Length Documentary 
 Look at What the Light Did Now directed by Anthony Seck

Music videos
 My Moon My Man directed by Patrick Daughters
 1234 directed by Patrick Daughters
 I Feel It All directed by Patrick Daughters
 The Water directed by Kevin Drew and starring Cillian Murphy
 Honey Honey directed by Anthony Seck

Live Performances from The Reminder Tour 2007-2009
 Limit to Your Love 
 Secret Heart (Ron Sexsmith cover) 
 Help is On Its Way (Little River Band cover)
 The Water

Disc two (CD)
Look at What the Light Did Now (Solo) – 3:59 
Limit To Your Love (Live) – 5:22 
When I Was a Young Girl (Live) – 4:55 
My Moon My Man (Live at the Cameron House, 29 October 2008) – 3:41 
Secret Heart (Live Ron Sexsmith cover) – 4:40 
Strangers (Live at the Cameron House, 29 October 2008, The Kinks cover) – 2:34 
So Sorry (Live) – 3:46 
Where Can I Go Without You? (Live in Paris 2007, Peggy Lee cover) – 3:37
Intuition (Chilly Gonzales solo) – 4:33
The Water (Chilly Gonzales solo) – 7:04 
Sea Lion Woman (Chilly Gonzales solo) – 3:35 
1234 (Chilly Gonzales solo) – 6:39
Look at What the Light Did Now (Duet with Little Wings) – 4:09

Tracks 9-12: Chilly Gonzales Original Score - Songs from The Reminder improvised and performed on solo piano.

Total running time: 58:43

References

External links

Live video albums
2010 live albums
2010 video albums
Concert films